Álvaro García Segovia (born 1 June 2000) is a Spanish footballer who plays as a central defender for CF Fuenlabrada, on loan from RCD Espanyol.

Club career
García was born in Albacete, Castilla-La Mancha, and joined Albacete Balompié's youth setup at the age of 11. He made his senior debut with the reserves on 26 August 2018 by starting in a 1–0 Tercera División home win over Mora CF, and scored his first goal on 23 September in a 4–2 home success over CD Marchamalo.

On 2 September 2019, García was transferred to Atlético Madrid and was initially assigned to the B-team in Segunda División B. On 28 August 2021, after the B's relegation, he moved to another reserve team, RCD Espanyol B in Segunda División RFEF.

García made his first team debut with the Pericos on 1 December 2021, coming on as a half-time substitute for Sergi Gómez in a 3–2 away win over SD Solares-Medio Cudeyo, for the season's Copa del Rey. The following 23 June, he agreed to a one-year loan deal with Segunda División side UD Ibiza.

García made his professional debut on 28 August 2022, replacing Kévin Appin in a 1–1 home draw against Deportivo Alavés. The following 31 January, his loan was cut short, and he moved to Primera Federación side CF Fuenlabrada also in a temporary deal.

References

External links

2000 births
Living people
Sportspeople from Albacete
Spanish footballers
Footballers from Castilla–La Mancha
Association football defenders
Segunda División players
Primera Federación players
Segunda División B players
Tercera División players
Atlético Albacete players
Atlético Madrid B players
RCD Espanyol B footballers
RCD Espanyol footballers
UD Ibiza players
CF Fuenlabrada footballers
Spain youth international footballers